Fly Jamaica Airways Flight 256 was a scheduled international passenger flight from Cheddi Jagan International Airport in Guyana to Toronto Pearson International Airport in Canada. The Boeing 757 aircraft serving the flight suffered a technical fault on 9 November 2018, forcing its return and resulting in a runway excursion on landing. This caused significant damage to the aircraft and one passenger fatality.

Aircraft
The aircraft involved was a Boeing 757-23N, registration N524AT, powered by two Rolls-Royce RB211 engines. It was built in 1999 and first flew with ATA Airlines, VIM, Aurela and Thomas Cook before being acquired by Fly Jamaica in 2012.

Flight details and accident
The aircraft departed from Cheddi Jagan International Airport in Guyana on 9 November 2018 at 02:09 local time, bound for Toronto, Canada. The flight subsequently reported a fault with the hydraulic system; as a result, the pilot aborted the climb and the plane returned to the departure airport for an emergency landing, touching down at 02:53. During the landing, the aircraft overran the runway and hit the airport perimeter fence, sustaining substantial damage in the process to the right-hand main landing gear and the  2 engine.

Passengers and crew 

There were approximately 118 passengers and 8 crew members on board the aircraft. Six persons were injured and an 86-year-old female passenger subsequently died on 16 November 2018 due to injuries sustained during the incident.

Investigation 
The accident is being investigated by the Guyana Civil Aviation Authority (GCAA) with assistance from the Canadian Transportation Safety Board (TSB) and the United States National Transportation Safety Board (NTSB). Preliminary data suggests a hydraulics failure occurred.

See also
Flight with disabled controls
United Airlines Flight 232
Turkish Airlines Flight 981
Japan Airlines Flight 123
Eastern Air Lines Flight 935
2003 Baghdad DHL attempted shootdown incident
List of accidents and incidents involving commercial aircraft

References

2018 in Guyana
Aviation accidents and incidents in Guyana
Aviation accidents and incidents caused by loss of control
Accidents and incidents involving the Boeing 757
Aviation accidents and incidents in 2018
November 2018 events in South America
Airliner accidents and incidents involving runway overruns